Jared Byers is a drummer. He was formerly the drummer for the Christian rock bands Relient K, Bleach, Royal Empire Music and Audio Adrenaline. Byers had previously filled-in on drums for Audio Adrenaline during a tour in early 2007, which were to be the band's final shows before reuniting in 2013. He also played drums for The Rocket Summer on tour.

In 2003, Jared Byers and his brother Milam, who was also in Bleach, took time off after their brother, Joshua, was killed while deployed in Iraq. The brothers returned to playing in the band around the time of Rock the Universe 2003, where it was said that they were "clearly giving their heart and soul into each moment of the set."

In 2010, the supergroup The Honeymoon Thrillers was formed. This band consists of Nathan Barlowe (from Luna Halo) on guitar and vocals, Cary Barlowe (from Luna Halo) on lead guitar, Chris Boyle (from Mean Tambourines) on bass, Josiah Holland (from The Lonely Hearts) on keyboards, and Jared Byers on drums.

In 2015, Jared Byers left Audio Adrenaline, to pursue other interests.

References

Living people
American performers of Christian music
Relient K members
Audio Adrenaline members
Year of birth missing (living people)
Peter Furler Band members